Salvation Nell is a lost 1915 silent film drama directed by George E. Middleton and starring Beatriz Michelena. It was produced by the California Motion Picture Company and released through World Film Corporation.

Cast
Beatriz Michelena - Nell Saunders
William Pike - Jim Platt
Nina Herbert - Nell's mother
Clarence Arper - Nell's father
James Leslie - Sid McGovern
Irene Outtrim - Myrtle
Myrtle Neuman - Sal
Frank Hollins - Old roue
Minnette Barrett - Young Woman
Andrew Robson - Major Williams
Katherine Angus - Halleluja Maggie
D. Mitsoras - Proprietor of Saloon
Earl Emlay - Tough

References

External links

1915 films
American silent feature films
World Film Company films
American black-and-white films
Lost American films
Silent American drama films
1915 drama films
1915 lost films
Lost drama films
1910s American films
1910s English-language films